Ghaida Kambash (1974 – 10 July 2020) was an Iraqi politician.

Biography
Kambash was from Baquba, north of Baghdad. She had a PhD in Political Sciences from the University of Baghdad. She was elected to the Council of Representatives of Iraq from 2010 till her death in 2020. She campaigned shortly before her death for a reform of the education system.

Kambash died in Baghdad on 10 July 2020, aged 46 due to COVID-19 during the COVID-19 pandemic in Iraq.

References

1974 births
2020 deaths
Politicians from Baghdad
21st-century Iraqi politicians
21st-century Iraqi women politicians
Members of the Council of Representatives of Iraq
University of Baghdad alumni
Deaths from the COVID-19 pandemic in Iraq